Ali Shariati Mazinani (23 November 1933 – 18 June 1977) was an Iranian revolutionary and sociologist who focused on the sociology of religion. He is held as one of the most influential Iranian intellectuals of the 20th century and has been called the "ideologue of the Iranian Revolution", although his ideas did not end up forming the basis of the Islamic Republic.

Biography
Ali Shariati (Ali Masharati) was born in 1933 in Mazinan, a suburb of Sabzevar, in northeastern Iran. His father's family were clerics. His father, Mohammad-Taqi, was a teacher and Islamic scholar. In 1947, he opened the Centre for the Propagation of Islamic Truths in Mashhad, in Khorasan Province. It was a social Islamic forum which became embroiled in the oil nationalisation movement of the 1950s. Shariati's mother was from a small land-owning family. His mother was from Sabzevar, a little town near Mashhad.

In his years at the Teacher's Training College in Mashhad, Shariati came into contact with young people who were from less privileged economic classes of society, and for the first time saw the poverty and hardship that existed in Iran during that period. At the same time, he was exposed to many aspects of Western philosophical and political thought. He attempted to explain and offer solutions for the problems faced by Muslim societies through traditional Islamic principles interwoven with, and understood from, the point of view of modern sociology and philosophy. His articles from this period for the Mashhad daily newspaper, Khorasan, display his developing eclecticism and acquaintance with the ideas of modernist thinkers such as Jamal al-Din al-Afghani, Sir Allama Muhammad Iqbal of Pakistan, among Muslims, and Sigmund Freud and Alexis Carrel.

In 1952, he became a high-school teacher and founded the Islamic Students' Association, which led to his arrest following a demonstration. In 1953, the year of Mossadeq's overthrow, he became a member of the National Front. He received his bachelor's degree from the University of Mashhad in 1955. In 1957, he was arrested again by the Iranian police, along with sixteen other members of the National Resistance Movement.

Shariati then managed to get a scholarship for France, where he continued his graduate studies at University of Paris under the supervision of the Iranist Gilbert Lazard. He left Paris after earning a PhD in Persian language in 1964. During this period in Paris, Shariati started collaborating with the Algerian National Liberation Front (FLN) in 1959. The following year, he began to read Frantz Fanon and translated an anthology of his work into Persian. Shariati introduced Fanon's thought into Iranian revolutionary émigrée circles. He was arrested in Paris on 17 January 1961 during a demonstration in honour of Patrice Lumumba.

The same year he joined Ebrahim Yazdi, Mostafa Chamran and Sadegh Qotbzadeh in founding the Freedom Movement of Iran abroad. In 1962, he continued studying sociology and the history of religions in Paris, and followed the courses of Islamic scholar Louis Massignon, Jacques Berque and the sociologist Georges Gurvitch. He also came to know the philosopher Jean-Paul Sartre that same year, and published Jalal Al-e Ahmad's book Gharbzadegi (or Occidentosis) in Iran.

Shariati then returned to Iran in 1964, where he was arrested and imprisoned for engaging in subversive political activities while in France. He was released after a few weeks, at which point he began teaching at the University of Mashhad.

Shariati next went to Tehran, where he began lecturing at the Hosseiniye Ershad Institute. These lectures were hugely popular among his students and were spread by word of mouth throughout all economic sectors of society, including the middle and upper classes, where interest in his teachings began to grow.

His continued success again aroused the interest of the government, which arrested him, along with many of his students. Widespread pressure from the people, and an international outcry, eventually led to his release on 20 March 1975, after eighteen months in solitary confinement.

Shariati was allowed to leave for England. He died three weeks later in a Southampton hospital under "mysterious circumstances", but in Ali Rahnema's biography of Shariati, he is said to have died of a heart attack. He is buried next to Sayyidah Zaynab, the granddaughter of the Islamic prophet Muhammad, and the daughter of Ali, in Damascus, where Iranian pilgrims often visit.

Views and popularity

Shariati sought to revive the revolutionary currents of Shiism. His interpretation of Shiism encouraged revolution in the world, and promised salvation after death. He referred to his brand of Shiism as "red Shiism" which he contrasted with non-revolutionary "black Shiism" or Safavid Shiism. His ideas have been compared to the Catholic Liberation Theology movement founded in South America by Peruvian Gustavo Gutierrez and Brazilian Leonardo Boff.

Shariati was a prominent Islamist philosopher, who argued that a good society would conform to Islamic values. He suggested that the role of government was to guide society in the best possible manner rather than manage it in the best possible way. He believed that the most learned members of the Ulema (clergy) should play a leadership role in guiding society because they best understand how to administer an Islamic value system based on the teachings of the Prophets of God and the 12 Shia Twelver Imams. He argued that the role of the clergy was to guide society in accordance with Islamic values to advance human beings towards reaching their highest potential—not to provide/serve the hedonistic desires of individuals as in the West.

At the same time, Shariati was very critical of some clerics and defended the Marxists. "Our mosques, the revolutionary left and our preachers," he declared, "work for the benefit of the deprived people and against the lavish and lush... Our clerics who teach jurisprudence and issue fatwas are right-wingers, capitalist, and conservative; simply our fiqh is at the service of capitalism."

Shariati's works were highly influenced by the Third Worldism that he encountered as a student in Paris—ideas that class war and revolution would bring about a just and classless society—from one side, and the epistemic decolonisation thinking of his time from the other side. He is said to have adopted the idea of Gharbzadegi from Jalal Al-e Ahmad and given it "its most vibrant and influential second life".

He sought to translate these ideas into cultural symbols of Shiism that Iranians could relate to. Shariati believed Shia should not merely await the return of the 12th Imam, but should actively work to hasten his return by fighting for social justice, "even to the point of embracing martyrdom," saying "every day is Ashoura, every place is the Karbala".

When he was writing the three letters to Fanon, unlike him, Shariati believed that it is not true that one must put away religion to fight imperialism. He felt that people could fight imperialism solely by recovering their cultural identity. In some countries, such an identity was intertwined with fundamental religious beliefs. Shariati refers to the maxim of returning to ourselves.

Social theorist Asef Bayat has recorded his observations as a witness and participant in the Iranian revolution of 1979. He asserts that Shariati emerged at the time of the revolution as "an unparalleled revolutionary intellectual" with his portraits widely present during the marches and protests and his nickname as "mo'allem-e enqilab" (revolutionary mentor) chanted by millions and whose literature and tapes had already been widely available before the revolution. "My father," recalls Bayat, "barely literate, had his own copies" of Shariati's works.

Shariati and socialism
It seems that his eagerness to explore socialism began with the translation of the book Abu Zarr: The God-Worshipping Socialist by the Egyptian thinker Abdul Hamid Jowdat-al-Sahar. According to this book, Abu Dhar was the very first socialist. Then, Shariarti's father declared that his son believed that the principles of Abu Dhar are fundamental. Even some thinkers described Shariati as the modern-day Abu Dhar in Iran. Of all his thoughts, there is his insistence on the necessity of revolutionary action. Shariati believed that Marxism could not provide the Third World with the ideological means for its own liberation. One of his premises was that Islam by nature is a revolutionary ideology. Therefore, Islam could relate to the modern world as an ideology. According to Shariati, the historical and original origin of human problems was the emergence of private ownership. He believed that in the modern era, the appearance of the machine was the second most fundamental change in the human condition. In fact, private ownership and the emergence of the machine, if considered one of two curves of history, belong to the second period of history. The first period is collective ownership. However, Shariati gave a critique of the historical development of religion and the modern philosophical and ideological movements and their relationship to both private ownership and the emergence of the machine.

Epistemology

Shariati developed the idea of the social, cultural and historical contingencies of religious knowledge in sociology. He believed in the earthly religion and in the social context in which the meaning of society is construed. He also emphasized that he understood religion historically because he was a sociologist. He said he was concerned with the historical and social Tawhid, not with the truth of the Quran or of Muhammad or Ali.

Philosophy of history
Completely contrary to Hegel and his philosophy of history, Shariati believed that it is not true that the civilized human is less conscious than modern people   but rather there is a difference between them. The civilized man could talk on himself more than the universe and the new people are so concerned with reality and the universe that there is no place for himself and mysticism and religion. Of course he knows the movement of soul in Hegel's philosophy and history in one sense as right.

Political philosophy
In the first place, Shariati criticised western liberal democracy. He pointed out that there is a direct relationship between democracy, liberalism and the plundering of nations. He believed that liberal democracy is the enemy of humankind. He also referred to the fact that the ruling economic system of liberal democracy is unjust and contrary to the rights of people. He maintained that in such a society, someone who is weak is already subjected to defeat and annihilation. There are basic foundations in Shariati's thoughts and his criticism of liberal democracy. The first foundation is related to the contrast between the religious worldview and the non-religious one. He explained history, society and humanity according to a monistic worldview. He explained liberalism as something with inequality and discrimination. Freedom and equality based on spirituality were the very basis of pre-modern societies which were devastated in one period of history.

Shariati believed that the government of Imam Ali could be considered the best form of democracy. On this occasion, he tried to interpret the behaviour of Imam Ali in contrast with his enemy. He called this democracy Commitment democracy. It appears that Shariati did not accept the western definition of democracy although he had no problem with democracy. According to him, a religious government is a democratic right of Muslim citizens. He believed that one of the basic problems of western democracy is demagogy. Nowadays the votes of voters are directed to special channels with the help of advertising instruments. In such a condition only one who is critically conscious can dispose of distractions and surface-level arguments, and vote effectively for themselves and their communities. He maintains that the western democracy based on gold, cruelty and tricking (Zar, Zour va Tazvir) is an anti-revolutionary regime that is different from ideological Guidance.

Commitment democracy

For explaining better the commitment to democracy, he at first divides between two concepts. One of them is Syasat and the other is politic. Syasat is a philosophy by the government that want to have the responsibility of changing and becoming the society, not its being and existence. In fact, Syasat is a progressive and dynamic thing. The aim of the government in the philosophy of Syasat is to change social foundations, institutions and even all the norms of society namely culture, morality and desires etc. in simple word, Syasat want to make exist the people. On contrary, there is no making in politics. In other words, politics is the following of having people not making them. Of course, Shariati prefers Syasat on politics because the former is more progressive. He considers making human (Ensan Sazi). In fact, his utopia is constructed with three concepts of Gnosis, equality and freedom. Commitment democracy appeared out of his lecture in Hoseyniyeh Ershad; a famous lecture with the name of Ummah and Imamate. According to him, Imam is one who wants to guide humans not only in political, social and economic dimensions but also in all existential dimensions. He believes that Imam is alive everywhere and every time. On one hand, Imamate is not a metaphysical belief but a revolutionary guide philosophy. He added that Imam has to guide people not according to his desire like a dictator but to Islamic ideology and authentic values.

Sociology
Some scholars classify him among the current religious neo-thinkers. According to this standpoint, Shariati accepted the rationality of the West. Shariati called the theoretical foundation of the West as civilization and called its appearances as Tajadod [Renewal]. He emphasized accepting civilization and criticized tajadod. He also believed that civilization has to be considered as something deep. He also highly acknowledged the importance of empirical science and knowledge. He appreciated the empirical methodology. He also criticized traditionalism for its disregard for scientific methodology. On another hand, he criticized the Modernists because they confuse the Western ideological theories with valid scientific epistemology. According to Shariati, the knowledge of reason is self-evident. Therefore, he suggested thinking of reason as the axiom for understanding the other sources namely the holy book or Quran, ḥadīth ('tradition'), sīra (Prophetic biography) and ijmāʿ (consensus). Shariati also dismissed consensus as a source for understanding religion. He insisted on the concepts of knowledge and time along with the holy book and tradition and stressed the important role of methodology and changing of viewpoint.

Shariati, who was the fan of Georges Gurvitch in his analysis of sociology, believed that there was no special pattern for the analysis of social affairs and historical events. He thought that there was no unity of religion and society, but rather there were many religions and societies. He referred to the active role of the scholar of human science during investigation and scientific research. He believed that there was a relationship between the values of scholarship and the effects of those values on the conclusions of an investigation. He believed that it was not necessary to extend the other conclusions of other Western scholars to our society. However, he criticized the Western ideological schools such as nationalism, liberalism, Marxism, etc. He maintained that there was conformity and correspondence between the Western philosophy and Iranian society. According to Shariati, democracy is inconsistent with revolutionary evolution and progress. One of his criticism of Western ideology is its [regardless imitation of those ideologies - check translation]. One of his other criticisms is the denial of spirituality in Western philosophy. In fact, those ideologies attempt to prevent humans from achieving transcendental goals and any [evolutionary movements - check translation].  In this vein, he firmly criticized capitalism, and at the same time, he admired socialism because it would lead humanity to evolution and free it from utilitarianism. However, he firmly criticized Karl Marx. According to Shariati, Karl Marx's theory on the economy as the infrastructure and foundation of human and society was strayed. Conversely, Sharia places the human, not the economy, as the foundation and origin of society.

Modern problems
According to Shariati, human history is composed of two stages, the stage of collectivity and the stage of private ownership. He explained that the first stage, collectivity, was concerned with social equality and spiritual oneness. But the second stage, which is the current era, could be considered as the domination of the many by one. The second stage began with the emergence of private ownership. The various types of private ownership in history have included slavery, serfdom, feudalism, and capitalism among others. According to the concept of social ownership, all material and spiritual resources are accessible to everyone. But monopoly polarised the human community. In fact, according to Shariati, private ownership is the main cause of all modern problems. These problems change men's brotherhood and love to duplicity, deceit, hatred, exploitation, colonisation, and massacre. The polarisation by monopoly manifested itself in different forms throughout history. For example, in ancient times there were slave economies that transferred to capitalist society in modern times. In other words, machinism, or the dependence on machines, can be considered the latest stage of private ownership. Machinism began in the nineteenth century and human beings have had to confront the many anxieties and problems arousing from it.

Legacy

There are many adherents and opponents of Shariati's views and Shariati's personality is largely unknown. Ali Khamenei knew Shariati as a pioneer of Islamic teaching according to the requirements of his generation. According to Sayyed Ali Khamenei, Shariati had both positive and negative characteristics. Khamenei believes that it is unfair to consider Shariati as someone who firmly disagreed with the Mullahs. One of the positive sides of Shariati was his ability to explain his thoughts with suitable and simple language for his generation. Shariati was somewhat supportive of Mullahs in Iran.  Some Scholars like Elizabeth F. Thompson try to envisage some similarities between Shariati and his role in the Islamic revolution in Iran with Sayyed Qutb's role in Egypt. One similarity is that both of them paved the way for the imminent revolution in Iran and Egypt. Both desired Islamic cultural dominance. Both were fans of being revolutionary about ruling values and norms. They considered Islamism a third way between those of America and the Soviet Union. At the same time they were not wholly utopian and they were partly Islamic.  Of course there are differences between them - Shariati was a leftist while Qutb was a conservative. According to Mahmoud Taleghani, Ali Shariati was a thinker who created a school for revolution. The school guided young people to revolutionary action. Beheshti believes that Shariati's work was fundamental to the Islamic revolution.

According to Hamid Enayat, Shariati was not only a theorist but also an adherent of Islamic radicalism. Enayat believes that Shariati can be considered the founder of Islamic socialism. Enayat considers him to be one of the most beloved and popular individuals in Islamic radicalism and socialism.

According to Hamid Algar, Shariati was the number one ideologue of the Islamic revolution.

Publications
Despite Shariati's early death, he was the author of "more than a hundred books", and the number of his publications goes up to some 200 if it includes "articles, seminar papers, and lecture series".

Major works
 Hajj (The Pilgrimage)
Hubut in Kavir
Guftuguhaye Tanha’i
 Marxism and Other Western Fallacies: An Islamic Critique
 Where Shall We Begin?
 Mission of a Free Thinker
 The Free Man and Freedom of the Man
 Extraction and Refinement of Cultural Resources
 Martyrdom (book)
 Ali
 An approach to Understanding Islam
 A Visage of Prophet Muhammad
 A Glance of Tomorrow's History
 Reflections of Humanity
 A Manifestation of Self-Reconstruction and Reformation
 Selection and/or Election
 Norouz, Declaration of Iranian's Livelihood, Eternity
 Expectations from the Muslim Woman
 Horr (Battle of Karbala)
 Kavir (Desert)
 Abu-Dahr
 Red Shi'ism vs. Black Shi'ism
 Jihad and Shahadat
 Reflections of a Concerned Muslim on the Plight of Oppressed People
 A Message to the Enlightened Thinkers
 Art Awaiting the Saviour
 Fatemeh is Fatemeh
 The Philosophy of Supplication
 Religion versus Religion
 Man and Islam – see chapter "Modern Man and His Prisons"
 Arise and Bear Witness
 Lessons on Islamology
 Ali is Alone
 Community and Leadership
 Religion against Religion
 We and Iqbal
 Historical Determinism
 What is to be Done?'
 "The Intelligentsia's Task for Reconstruction of Society"

Other Works
 Hegel und Ali Shariati: Geschichtsphilosophische Betrachtungen im Geiste der islamischen Revolution im Iran doi:10.1515/hgjb-2014-0158
 Paradox as Decolonization: Ali Shariati's Islamic Lawgiver doi:10.1177/0090591720977804

Translation
Shariati translated many books into Persian. Besides the work of Abu Zarr mentioned above, he translated Jean-Paul Sartre's What Is Literature?, and Che Guevara's Guerilla Warfare. He also began to work on the translation of Franz Fanon's A Dying Colonialism. He admired Amar Ouzegane as a major Marxist Muslim and began to translate his book Le meilleur combat (The Best Struggle).

 See also 
 Intellectual Movements in Iran
 Islamic Marxism
 Islamic revival
 List of Islamic scholars
 Philosophy in Iran
 Red Shi'ism vs. Black Shi'ism
 Religious Intellectualism in Iran
 Jalal Al-e-Ahmad
 Hamid Algar
 Geydar Dzhemal modern philosopher of Politic Islam, revolutionist and social activist
 Abdulaziz Sachedina, a student of Shariati

 References 

 Further reading 
 Latifiyan, Ali. 1995. "Reviewing the Performance of Intellectuals from 1941 to 1979", Tehran: Imam Sadiq University
 Rahnema, Ali. 1998. An Islamic Utopian: A Political Biography of Ali Shariati. London: I.B. Tauris.
 Gheissari, Ali. 1998. Iranian Intellectuals in the Twentieth Century''. Austin: University of Texas Press.

External links

 The Official WebSite of Dr Ali Shariati
 Biography and publications
 'Ali Shari'ati: Between Marx and the Infinite' A review essay of Ali Rahnema's biography of Shari'ati with an extensive discussion on the philosopher's political significance by Nathan Coombs
 Humanity and the People Power: A Tribute to Dr. Ali Shariati by Dr. Mohammad Omar Farooq
 'Ali Shari'ati: Islamic Fundamentalist, Marxist Ideologist and Sufi Mystic by David Zeidan
 Critical Religious Reason: Ali Shari'ati on Religion, Philosophy and Emancipation by Abbas Manoochehri
 The forgotten revolutionary: Ali Shariati by Lawrence Reza Ershaghi

1933 births
1977 deaths
Iranian Shia scholars of Islam
People from Sabzevar
Freedom Movement of Iran politicians
Iranian democracy activists
Iranian dissidents
Iranian essayists
20th-century Iranian philosophers
Iranian sociologists
Iranian writers
Islamic philosophers
Muslim reformers
University of Paris alumni
Iqbal scholars
20th-century poets
Iranian Islamists
20th-century essayists
Critics of Marxism